Benedict II may refer to:
 Benedict II, Archbishop of Esztergom (died after 1261)
 Pope Benedict II (died 685), Pope of the Catholic Church